Rockingham station  may refer to:

 Rockingham bus station, Perth, Australia
 Rockingham railway station (Leicestershire), England
 Rockingham railway station, Perth, Australia
 Rockingham station (Nova Scotia), Canada
 Rockingham railway station (South Yorkshire), England